The UEFA European Championship is one of the major competitive international football tournaments, first played in 1960, whose finals stage has been held every four years. The Croatia national football team has contested this tournament since 1996, having been part of Yugoslavia up until the qualifying stages for the 1992 edition. Croatia has qualified for every Euro competition except for the 2000 edition, played in Belgium and the Netherlands. The team's best performances have been reaching the quarter-finals twice — in 1996 and 2008, losing to Germany and Turkey, respectively.

Overall record 

*Draws include knockout matches decided via penalty shoot-out.

UEFA Euro 1996

Qualifying

Group stage

Knockout stage

Quarter-finals

UEFA Euro 2000

Qualifying

UEFA Euro 2004

Qualifying

Play-offs

Croatia won 2–1 on aggregate and qualified for UEFA Euro 2004.

Group stage

UEFA Euro 2008

Qualifying

In the qualifiers, Croatia was drawn into Group E of Euro 2008's qualifications, along with Andorra, England, Estonia, Macedonia, Israel and Russia.

Over the course of qualifying, Croatia racked up nine wins, two draws, and one loss. Croatia's loss was a 2–0 defeat at Skopje, Macedonia. Croatia and Romania became the final teams to record their first loss, both on the 17 November 2007 matchday, in a qualification cycle where every team suffered at least one defeat. Croatia gathered numerous headlines after knocking England out on the final matchday, with a 3–2 victory at Wembley Stadium.

Croatian striker Eduardo was the second-highest goalscorer in qualifications with ten goals, trailing Northern Ireland's David Healy.

Group stage

Knockout phase

Quarter-finals

UEFA Euro 2012

Qualifying

Play-offs

Croatia won 3–0 on aggregate and qualified for UEFA Euro 2012.

Group stage

UEFA Euro 2016

Qualifying

Group stage

Knockout phase

Round of 16

UEFA Euro 2020

Qualifying

Group stage

Knockout phase

Round of 16

List of matches

Players with most appearances

Goalscorers

Awards 
 Team of the Tournament: Davor Šuker (1996), Luka Modrić (2008)
 With three goals, Mario Mandžukić was the joint-top scorer in 2012 alongside five other players, but failed to win an award.

See also 
 Croatia at the FIFA World Cup
 Croatia in the UEFA Nations League

Notes

References

External links 

 
Countries at the UEFA European Championship